Doug Frost may refer to:

 Doug Frost (swimming coach) (born 1943), Australian swimming coach
 Doug Frost (wine), American Master of Wine, Master Sommelier and author